Homona phanaea is a species of moth of the family Tortricidae. It is found on the Solomon Islands, in New Guinea, on the St. Aignan Islands, the Kei Islands and possibly the Philippines.

The larvae feed on Ochroma pyramidale.

References

Moths described in 1910
Homona (moth)